"The Ghetto" is a socially conscious, mostly instrumental jazz-flavored anthem, released as the first single off American soul singer Donny Hathaway's debut album, Everything Is Everything, released as a single in 1969 on Atlantic Records.

The song was co-written by Hathaway and Leroy Hutson. The song was a 6-minute and 50 second extravaganza which built upon a cinematic feel with its lengthy instrumental though it did feature vocal ad-libs from Hathaway, who played Wurlitzer electronic piano on the song, and constant chants of the song's title. The song has a distinctive Afro-Cuban sound with congas.

The song also featured additional background dialogue from what sounds like men talking on a street corner and a baby crying - that baby being Hathaway's own daughter Lalah before Hathaway ended the song with frenetic hand claps.

When originally released in 1969, the song became a modest charted single, peaking at number 87 on the Billboard Hot 100 and number 23 on the Billboard Hot Soul Singles chart.

The song was also featured on Hathaway's revered Live album in which Hathaway and his musicians played a faster version of the song and later featured Hathaway getting the audience to sing the final chorus. The song was also used in the 1977 film Short Eyes.

Co-writer Leroy Hutson recorded a version of the song entitled "The Ghetto '74" for his album The Man! (1973). Since then, the song has been sampled in hip-hop songs, most famously, Too Short's "The Ghetto", which featured Gerald Levert singing the chorus.

George Benson, accompanied by keyboardist Joe Sample, covered the song on his album Absolute Benson.

Personnel
Donny Hathaway: lead vocals, Wurlitzer electronic piano, bass
Eulalah Hathaway: background vocals
Master Henry Gibson: conga solo
Morris Jennings: drums
Marshall Hawkins: bass
Phil Upchurch: guitar
Richard Powell: percussion & timbales Solo
Written and composed by Donny Hathaway and Leroy Hutson
Conducted and arranged by Donny Hathaway
Produced by Donny Hathaway and Ric Powell

References

1969 songs
1970 singles
Soul jazz songs
1960s instrumentals
Donny Hathaway songs
Songs written by Leroy Hutson